"Defection" is the 11th CD single by Minori Chihara. It was released simultaneously with her 12th single, "Key for Life." The single ranked 9th on the Oricon charts in the week it debuted.

Track listing
Defection
Raison pour la saison

References

Lantis (company) singles
2011 singles
Minori Chihara songs
2011 songs